Frederick Landis (August 18, 1872 – November 15, 1934) was an American lawyer and politician who served two terms as a U.S. Representative from Indiana from 1903 to 1907. 

He was a brother of both Charles Beary Landis and of baseball commissioner Judge Kenesaw Mountain Landis.

Biography 
Born at Seven Mile, Ohio, Landis moved with his parents to Logansport, Indiana, in 1875.
He attended the public schools.
He was graduated from the law department of the University of Michigan at Ann Arbor in 1895.
He was admitted to the bar the same year and commenced practice at Logansport, Indiana.

Congress 
Landis was elected as a Republican to the Fifty-eighth and Fifty-ninth Congresses (March 4, 1903 – March 3, 1907).
He was an unsuccessful candidate for reelection in 1906 to the Sixtieth Congress.

Later career and death 
He returned to Logansport and engaged in writing and lecturing.
He was one of the organizers of the Progressive Party in 1912 and temporary chairman of its first State convention in Indiana.

He served as a delegate to the National Progressive Convention at Chicago in 1912.
He was an unsuccessful candidate for governor on the Progressive ticket in 1912.
He was an unsuccessful candidate for the nomination for governor on the Republican ticket in 1928.
He was an author and lecturer.

Landis was elected to the Seventy-fourth Congress on November 6, 1934, but died in a hospital in Logansport, Indiana, November 15, 1934, before Congress had convened.

He was interred in Mount Hope Cemetery.

References

External links
 
 
 Fred Landis entry at The Political Graveyard 

 
 
 

1872 births
1934 deaths
People from Logansport, Indiana
People from Butler County, Ohio
University of Michigan Law School alumni
Republican Party members of the United States House of Representatives from Indiana